Antlers, sometimes NTLRS, is a German black metal band based in Leipzig, Saxony. The band’s songs are noted for being "relentlessly aggressive" but marked especially by attention to melody. Their first album, A Gaze into the Abyss, was released in May 2015. The second album, Beneath. Below. Behold, was released in March 2018.

Discography

Albums 
 A Gaze Into The Abyss (2015)
 Beneath. Below. Behold (2018)

References

External links 
 

German black metal musical groups